The 2008–09 Hong Kong First Division League season, known as Coolpoint Ventilation First Division for sponsorship reasons, was the 97th since its establishment in 1908. It began on 6 September 2008 and ended on 10 May 2009. The unveiling match was contested by the defending champions South China, and the runners-up of last season Citizen. They made a 1–1 draw, scored by Sandro of Citizen and Detinho of South China, China.

Three new teams joined the league as competition members, including Fourway, TSW Pegasus and Xiangxue Eisiti. The league consisted of 13 teams, the most since the 1979–80 season.

League team changes
Teams promoted from 2007–08 Hong Kong Second Division League
 Champions: Mutual
Teams relegated to 2008–09 Hong Kong Second Division League
 Bulova Rangers (renamed as Rangers)
New teams in Hong Kong football league system
 Fourway
 TSW Pegasus
 Xiangxue Eisiti (from mainland China)
Teams changed the name
 NT Realty Wofoo Tai Po (named as Wofoo Tai Po before)
 Sheffield United (named as Lanwa Redbull before, from mainland China)
 Tuen Mun Progoal (named as Workable before)

League table

Results

All times are Hong Kong Time (UTC+8).

Round 1

Round 2

Round 3

Round 4

Round 5

 South China is awarded a 3 – 0 win against TSW Pegasus due to TSW Pegasus used more than the allowed maximum of 6 foreign players at a time in the match.

Round 6

Round 7

Round 8

Round 9

Round 10

Round 11

Round 12

Round 13

Round 14

Round 15

Round 16

Round 17

Round 18

Round 19

Round 20

Round 21

Round 22

Round 23

Round 24

Round 25

Round 26

Season statistics

Scoring
First goal of the season: Sandro for Citizen against South China (6 September 2008).
First own goal of the season: Ma Ka Ki (Citizen) for Fourway (18 October 2008).
Most goals scored by one player in a match: 4 goals – Detinho (South China) against Tuen Mun Progoal,  (20 September 2008) and against Convoy Sun Hei,  (14 December 2008).
Widest winning margin: 9 goals – Tuen Mun Progoal 0–9 South China (20 September 2008).
Most goals in a match: 9 goals
Most goals in one half
Most goals in one half by a single team

Discipline
First yellow card of the season
First red card of the season
Most yellow cards in a single match
Most red cards in a single match

Miscellaneous
Most consecutive games without conceding a goal

Top scorers

Only players scored ≥9 is shown.

Stadia

Mong Kok Stadium and Hong Kong Stadium are the primary venue for the majority of the games. Some other stadiums also will be used, including Siu Sai Wan Sports Ground, Tai Po Sports Ground and Yuen Long Stadium.

NT Realty Wofoo Tai Po has successfully applied to use Tai Po Sports Ground for their 12 home games. TSW Pegasus also applied to use Yuen Long Stadium as their home ground, but the stadium's facilities and grass turf conditions could not be modified in time for this season. However, South China AA agreed to play away at Yuen Long Stadium on 5 October 2008. HKFA chairman Leung Hung Tak later claimed that three home games will be played at Yuen Long Stadium for TSW Pegasus this season.

Xiangxue Eisiti had suggested using a stadium in Shenzhen for their home games. But due to the poor quality of the facility, the HKFA deemed it unsuitable for the First Division. Its home games will now be staged either at Mong Kok Stadium or Siu Sai Wan Sports Ground instead.

See also
2008–09 Hong Kong Senior Challenge Shield
2008–09 Hong Kong League Cup
2008–09 Hong Kong FA Cup
2009 AFC Cup

References

External links 
 
 Fixtures

Hong Kong First Division League seasons
1
Hong Kong